Make Up For Ever is a French cosmetics brand owned by LVMH. It was created in 1984 by make-up artist Dany Sanz.

History
Make Up For Ever was founded in 1984 by make-up artist Dany Sanz. It provides cosmetics to professional make-up artists in the fashion and film sectors. LVMH acquired the brand in 1999 to expand its make-up offerings and developed the offering to appeal to its fashion customer base. In 2004, Nicolas Cordier was named CEO and formed a manager/creator team with Sanz. Gabrielle Rodriguez, the current CEO, was appointed in 2019.

In 2002, Make Up For Ever Academy started in Paris, and has since expanded to New York, Shanghai, Hong Kong, Seoul, Singapore, Brussels, Helsinki and Nice.

References

LVMH brands
French brands
Cosmetics companies of France
Cosmetics brands